Mount Si (pronounced ), known as q'əlpc' to the Snoqualmie people, is a mountain in the northwest United States, east of Seattle, Washington.  It lies on the western margin of the Cascade Range just above the coastal plains around Puget Sound, and towers over the nearby town of North Bend. Mount Si and neighboring mountain Little Si were named after local homesteader Josiah "Uncle Si" Merritt. The mountain became nationally familiar in the early 1990s with the television series Twin Peaks, which was filmed in North Bend.

Only about a 45-minute drive from Seattle, the mountain is a favorite outdoor destination for residents of Puget Sound. Between 80,000 and 100,000 hikers visit the mountain annually. The land is owned by the state of Washington and has been designated a Natural Resources Conservation Area.

The  Mount Si trail vertically climbs  to the summit ridge. Its summit is reached by an exposed scramble, up the north side of the summit block, which is known as the "Haystack".

The peak can be accessed by two trails. The Old Mount Si trail is accessed by the Little Si parking lot and the Boulder Garden Loop. It is  shorter,  steeper in elevation gain, and less crowded than the main trail. The Mount Si trail is accessed by the Mount Si parking lot.

Oceanic Plate Volcano

Mount Si is a remnant of an oceanic plate volcano and the rocks are highly metamorphosed. The rock deposits are a melange including metagabbro, and are Jurassic-Cretaceous in age.

In local native legend
Mount Si figures prominently in a Prometheus story from the Snoqualmie tribe.  According to the story it is the dead body of Snoqualm, the moon.  Snoqualm had ordered that a rope of cedar bark be stretched between the earth and the sky.  But Fox and Blue Jay went up the rope and stole the sun from Snoqualm.  Snoqualm chased them down the cedar rope, but it broke and he fell to his death.  Fox then let the sun free in the sky and gave fire to the people.  A face like Snoqualm's is visible on the rocks near the summit.

References

External links

 
 
 
 View of Mount Si from I-90 on Google Street View

Mountains of King County, Washington
Mountains of Washington (state)
Washington Natural Areas Program
Protected areas of King County, Washington